The Admirable Crichton is a 1968 TV movie adaptation of the 1902 play The Admirable Crichton by J. M. Barrie. It stars Bill Travers and Virginia McKenna.

It was filmed for Hallmark Hall of Fame and was directed by George Schaefer.

Cast
Bill Travers as Crichton
Virginia McKenna as Lady Mary
Janet Munro as Tweeny
Norman Barrs as The Officer
Pamela Brown as Lady Brocklehurst
Edward Cicciarelli as Treherne
Richard Easton as Ernest Woolley
Christina Gillespie as Fisher
Estelle Kohler as Lady Agatha
Laurence Naismith as Lord Loam
Carrie Nye as Lady Catherine
Ralph Purdom as Lord Brocklehurst

Production
The show was taped in New York over a month in February and March 1968. McKenna said the play was "a comment on our society, how our social code of behaviour imprisons people and stops them from being natural."

Reception
The Chicago Tribune called it "absorbing, humorous entertainment". The New York Times felt it was a "lacklustre production" which suffered from trimming the first act and where Travers "was simply miscast".

Bill Travers was nominated for an Emmy for Outstanding Performance by an Actor.

References

External links

1960s English-language films
Films about survivors of seafaring accidents or incidents
American films based on plays
Films based on works by J. M. Barrie
1968 television films
1968 films
Hallmark Hall of Fame episodes
Films directed by George Schaefer